The following is a list of all songs recorded by Huey Lewis and the News.

 The table lists each song title by Huey Lewis and the News, the songwriters for each song, the album or soundtrack on which the song first appeared, and the year in which the song was released.

Songs

Notes

References

External links 
 

 
Lewis, Huey and the News